Khairagarh is one of the 90 Legislative Assembly constituencies of Chhattisgarh state in India. It is in Rajnandgaon district.

Members of Legislative Assembly

Election results

2022 by-election 
A by-election was needed due to the death of the sitting MLA, Devwrat Singh on 4 November 2021.

2018

See also
List of constituencies of the Chhattisgarh Legislative Assembly
Rajnandgaon district
 Rajnandgaon

References

Rajnandgaon district
Assembly constituencies of Chhattisgarh